A. S. Subbaraj (28 October 1914 – 22 February 1963) was an Indian politician and former Member of the Legislative Assembly of Tamil Nadu. He was elected to the Tamil Nadu legislative assembly as an Indian National Congress candidate from Uthamapalayam constituency in  1952 election and from Bodinayakkanur constituency in 1957 and 1962 elections.

He hailed from a prominent Chettiar family, The Pankajam family of Bodinayakanur.

References 

Indian National Congress politicians from Tamil Nadu
1914 births
1963 deaths
Members of the Tamil Nadu Legislative Assembly